Koryo-saram (Uzbek: Koryo-saram) is the name which ethnic Koreans in the post-Soviet states use to refer to themselves. The term is composed of two Korean words: "", a historical name for Korea, and "", meaning "person" or "people".

Approximately 500,000 ethnic Koreans reside in the former Soviet Union, primarily in the now-independent states of Central Asia. There are also large Korean communities in Southern Russia (around Volgograd), Russian Far East (around Vladivostok), the Caucasus and southern Ukraine. These communities can be traced back to the Koreans who were living in the Russian Far East during the late 19th century.

There is also a separate ethnic Korean community on the island of Sakhalin, typically referred to as Sakhalin Koreans. Some may identify as Koryo-saram, but many do not. Unlike the communities on the Russian mainland primarily descended from Koreans who arrived in the late 19th century and early 20th century, the ancestors of the Sakhalin Koreans were immigrants from 조선 (Joseon) under Japanese imperial rule—mostly from the southern provinces, 경상북도 Gyeongsangbug-do (North Gyeongsang Province), 경상남도 Gyeongsangnam-do (South Gyeongsang Province), 전라북도 Jeollabug-do (North Jeolla Province), and 전라남도 Jeollanam-do (South Jeolla Province) —in the late 1930s and early 1940s; forced into service by the Japanese government to work in coal mines in what was then Karafuto Prefecture, in order to fill labor shortages caused by the Pacific War.

Autonym
The word Koryo in "Koryo-saram" originated from the name of the Goryeo (Koryŏ) Dynasty from which "Korea" was also derived. The name Soviet Korean was also used, more frequently before the collapse of the Soviet Union. Russians may also lump Koryo-saram under the general label koreytsy; however, this usage makes no distinctions between ethnic Koreans of the local nationality and the Korean nationals (citizens of North Korea or South Korea).

In Standard Korean, the term "Koryo-saram" is typically used to refer to historical figures from the Goryeo dynasty; to avoid ambiguity, Korean speakers use a word Goryeoin (Hanja: 高麗人, meaning the same as "Koryo-saram") to refer to ethnic Koreans in the post-Soviet states. However, the Sino-Korean morpheme "-in" (인) is not productive in Koryo-mal, the dialect spoken by Koryo-saram and as a result, only a few (mainly those who have studied Standard Korean) refer to themselves by this name; instead, "Koryo-saram" has come to be the preferred term.

Origins

Immigration to the Russian Far East and Siberia
The early 19th century saw the decline of the Joseon Dynasty of Korea. A small population of wealthy elite owned the farmlands in the country, and poor peasants found it difficult to survive. Koreans leaving the country in this period were obliged to move toward Russia, as the border with China was sealed by the Qing Dynasty. However, the first Koreans in the Russian Empire, 761 families totalling 5,310 people, had actually migrated to Qing territory; the land they had settled on was ceded to Russia by the Convention of Peking in 1860. Many peasants considered Siberia to be a land where they could lead better lives, and so they subsequently migrated there. According to Russian sources early as 1863, 13 Korean households were recorded in Posyet, near Bay of Novgorod. These numbers rose dramatically, and by 1869 Koreans composed 20% of the population of the Primorsky Krai. Prior to the completion of the Trans-Siberian Railway, Koreans outnumbered Russians in the Russian Far East; the local governors encouraged them to naturalize. The village of Blagoslovennoe was founded in 1870 by Korean migrants. Another Korean village near Zolotoy Rog that Russians called Kareskaya slabodka (Корейская слабодка, literally means Korean village) and what Koreans called "Gaecheok-ri" (開拓里,개척리) was officially recognized by the Vladivostok authorities. The 1897 Russian Empire Census found 26,005 Korean speakers (16,225 men and 9,780 women) in the whole of Russia.

In the early 20th century, both Russia and Korea came into conflict with Japan. Following the end of the Russo-Japanese War in 1907, Russia enacted an anti-Korean law at the behest of Japan, under which the land of Korean farmers was confiscated and Korean labourers were laid off. However, Korean migration to Russia continued to grow; 1914 figures showed 64,309 Koreans (among whom 20,109 were Russian citizens). Even the 1917 Bolshevik Revolution did nothing to slow migration; after the repression of the 1919 March 1st Movement in Japanese-colonised Korea, migration actually intensified. Korean leaders in Vladivostok's Sinhanchon (literally, "New Korean Village") neighbourhood also provided support to the independence movement, making it a centre for nationalist activities, including arms supply; the Japanese attacked it on 4 April 1920, leaving hundreds dead. By 1923, the Korean population in the Soviet Union had grown to 106,817. The following year, the Soviets began taking measures to control Korean population movement to their territory; however, they were not completely successful until 1931; after that date, they halted all migration from Korea and required existing migrants to naturalise as Soviet citizens.

The Soviet policy of korenizatsiya (indigenisation) resulted in the creation of 105 Korean village soviets (councils) in mixed-nationality raion, as well as an entire raion for the Korean nationality, the Pos'et Korean National Raion; these conducted their activities entirely in the Korean language. The Soviet Koreans had a large number of their own official institutions, including 380 Korean schools, two teachers' colleges, one pedagogical school, three hospitals, a theatre, six journals, and seven newspapers (the largest of which, Vanguard, had a circulation of 10,000). The 1937 Census showed 168,259 Koreans in the Soviet Union. However, officials in the Russian Far East viewed the Koreans' ethnic and family ties to the Japanese Empire with suspicion, which would soon set the stage for the deportation of the whole population.

Deportation to Central Asia

In 1937, facing reports from the People's Commissariat for Internal Affairs (NKVD) that there were possibilities that Japanese would have infiltrate the Russian Far East by means of ethnic Korean spies, Joseph Stalin and Vyacheslav Molotov signed Resolution 1428-326 ss, "On the Exile of the Korean Population from border Raions of the Far East Kray", on 21 August. According to the report of Nikolai Yezhov, 36,442 Korean families totalling 171,781 persons were deported by 25 October. The deported Koreans faced difficult conditions in Central Asia: monetary assistance promised by the government never materialised, and furthermore, most of the deported were rice farmers and fishermen, who had difficulty adapting to the arid climate of their new home. Estimates based on population statistics suggest that 40,000 deported Koreans died in 1937 and 1938 for these reasons. Nonetheless, the deportees cooperated to build irrigation works and start rice farms; within three years, they had recovered their original standard of living. The events of this period led to the formation of a cohesive identity among the Korean deportees. However, in schools for Soviet Korean children, the government switched Korean language from being the medium of instruction to being taught merely as a second language in 1939, and from 1945 stopped it from being taught entirely; furthermore, the only publication in the Korean language was the Lenin Kichi (Korean: 레닌 기치, English: The Lenin Flag). As a result, subsequent generations lost the use of the Korean language, which J. Otto Pohl described as "emasculat[ing] the expression of Korean culture in the Soviet Union. Up until the era of glasnost, it was not permitted to speak openly of the deportations.

Post-deportation
Scholars estimated that roughly 470,000 Koryo-saram were living in the Commonwealth of Independent States.

Russia

The 2002 census gave a population of 148,556 Koreans in Russia, of which 75,835 were male and 72,721 female. More than half were living in Asian Russia. Meanwhile, the 2010 census gave a population of 153,156 Koreans in Russia, this time more than half were living in European Russia instead, but Russian Far East remained the federal district with highest number of Koreans. The Korean population there trace their roots back to a variety of sources. Aside from roughly 33,000 CIS nationals, mostly migrants retracing in reverse the 1937 deportation of their ancestors, between 4,000 and 12,000 North Korean migrant labourers can be found in the region. Smaller numbers of South Koreans and ethnic Koreans from China have also come to the region to settle, invest, and/or engage in cross-border trade.

Ukraine

In the 2001 census in Ukraine 12,711 people defined themselves as ethnic Koreans, up from 8,669 in 1989. Of these only 17.5% gave Korean as their native language. The majority (76%) named Russian as their native language, while 5.5% named Ukrainian. The largest concentrations can be found in Kharkiv, Kyiv, Odesa, Mykolaiv, Cherkasy, Lviv, Luhansk, Donetsk, Dnipro, Zaporizhia and Crimea. The largest ethnic representative body, the Association of Koreans in Ukraine, is located in Kharkiv, where roughly 150 Korean families reside; the first Korean language school was opened in 1996 under their direction. Some of the most famous Korean-Ukrainians are Vitaliy Kim, current governor of Mykolaiv Oblast, and Oleksandr Sin, former mayor of Zaporizhzhia. After 2001, many Koreans migrated into Ukraine from Central Asia.

Central Asia

The majority of Koryo-saram in Central Asia reside in Kazakhstan and Uzbekistan. Korean culture in Kazakhstan is centered in Almaty, the former capital. For much of the 20th century, this was the only place in Central Asia where a Korean language newspaper (the Koryo Shinmun) and Korean language theater were in operation. The censuses of Kazakhstan recorded 96,500 Koryo-saram in 1939, 74,000 in 1959, 81,600 in 1970, 92,000 in 1979, 100,700 in 1989, and 99,700 in 1999.

In Kyrgyzstan, the population has remained roughly stable over the past three censuses: 18,355 (1989), 19,784 (1999), and 17,299 (2009). This contrasts sharply with other non-indigenous groups such as Germans, many of whom migrated to Germany after the breakup of the Soviet Union. South Korea never had any programme to promote return migration of their diaspora in Central Asia, unlike Germany. However, they have established organisations to promote Korean language and culture, such as the Korean Centre of Education which opened in Bishkek in 2001. South Korean Christian missionaries are also active in the country.

The population in Uzbekistan is largely scattered in rural areas. This population has suffered in recent years from linguistic handicaps, as the Koryo-saram there spoke Russian but not Uzbek. After the independence of Uzbekistan, many lost their jobs due to being unable to speak the national language. Some emigrated to the Russian Far East, but found life difficult there as well.

There is also a small Korean community in Tajikistan. Mass settlement of Koreans in the country began during the late 1950s and early 1960s, after the loosening of restrictions on their freedom of movement which had previously kept them confined to Uzbekistan and Kazakhstan. Pull factors for migration included rich natural resources and a relatively mild climate. Their population grew to 2,400 in 1959, 11,000 in 1979 and 13,000 in 1989; most lived in the capital Dushanbe, with smaller concentrations in Qurghonteppa and Khujand. Like Koreans in other parts of Central Asia, they generally possessed higher incomes compared to members of other ethnic groups. However, with the May 1992 onset of civil war in Tajikistan, many fled the country; by 1996, their population had fallen by over half to 6,300 people. Most are engaged in agriculture and retail business. Violence continued even after the end of the civil war; in 2000, suspected Hizb ut-Tahrir members exploded a bomb in a Korean Christian church in Dushanbe, killing 9 and wounding 30.

Return migration to Korea

There was some minor return migration of Soviet Koreans to Korea in the first half of the 20th century. They formed 4 main groups: those sent for intelligence work during the Japanese colonial period, the Red Army personnel who arrived in 1945–1946, civilian advisors and teachers who arrived in the northern half of the peninsula in 1946–1948 and individuals who repatriated from the Soviet Union to North Korea for personal reasons. Though it was common in most of the newly socialist countries of the Eastern Bloc to receive Soviet-educated personnel who were from the country or had ancestral ethnic connections there, in North Korea such returned members of national diaspora played a more important role than in other countries.

Later, labour migration to South Korea would grow to a large size. , as many as 10,000 Uzbekistani nationals worked in South Korea, with most of them being ethnic Koreans. It is estimated that remittances from South Korea to Uzbekistan exceed $100 million annually.

Culture
After their arrival in Central Asia, the Koryo-saram quickly established a way of life different from that of neighbouring peoples. They set up irrigation works and became known throughout the region as rice farmers. They interacted little with the nomadic peoples around them and focused on education. Although they soon ceased to wear traditional Korean clothing, they adopted Western-style dress rather than the clothing worn by the Central Asian peoples.

The ritual life of the Koryo-saram community has changed in various respects. Marriages have taken on the Russian style. At Korean traditional funerals, the coffin is taken out of the house either through the window or a single door threshold; however, if there is more than one door threshold on the way out (e.g. in modern multi-stories buildings), three notches are made on each threshold. The name of the dead is traditionally written in hanja; however, as hardly anyone is left among the Koryo-saram who can write in hanja, the name is generally written in hangul only. On the other hand, the rituals for the first birthday and sixtieth anniversary have been preserved in their traditional form.

Cuisine

Koryo-saram have preserved the Korean cuisine particularly well. The cuisine of the Koryo-saram is closest to that of the Hamgyong provinces in North Korea and is dominated by meat soups and salty side dishes. It uses similar cooking techniques but is adapted to local ingredients, which resulted in invention of new dishes. One well-known example is spicy carrot salad, known throughout the Soviet Union as Korean carrot salad. It is a Koryo-saram invention and was unknown in South Korea until recently. However, it has gained an international following, being served in most cafeterias throughout the CIS, sold in all supermarkets and featured regularly as a side dish on dinner tables and in holiday feasts set by all ethnicities of the former Soviet Union.

On the other hand, some South Korean dishes such as bulgogi, bibimbap and samgyeopsal were relatively unknown to Koryo-saram until recently. Dishes traditionally popular among Koryo-saram include pigodi, kuksu (Korean: 국수), timpeni, khe, chartagi, kadi che (Korean: 가지채), kosari che (Korean: 고사리채), chirgym che, panchan, schirak tyamuri and kadyuri.

Personal and family names

Many Korean surnames, when Cyrillized, are spelled and pronounced slightly differently from the romanisations used in the U.S. and the resulting common pronunciations, as can be seen in the table at right. Some surnames of Koryo-saram have a particle "gai" added to them, such as Kogai or Nogai. The origin of this is unclear. The introduction of international passports by newly independent CIS countries, resulted in further differences in pronunciation as Korean surnames had to be transliterated from Cyrillic into Latin. In addition to a surname, Koreans also use clan names (known as Bon-gwan in Korea and pronounced as пой among Koryo-saram) denoting the place of origin.

Korean naming practices and Russian naming practices are different - Koryo-saram use Russian name practices, but Korean surnames and sometimes Korean names. But most often Christian names are used from the saints of the Russian Orthodox Church, typical for Russians.

Patronymics
Legislation of the Russian Empire in issuing documents required the father's name.

Koreans began with the use of patronymics that were formed from the Korean names of their fathers. Over time, as the proportion of Christians increased, Koreans were given, in accordance with the tradition of the Russian Orthodox Church, names from the general list of revered saints. Currently, 80% of Koryo-saram have a record of their Korean names. This differs from the pattern typical in the US, where Korean American parents often register their children with a Korean given name as their legal middle name (e.g. Daniel Dae Kim, Harold Hongju Koh).

Surnames of married women

In Korea, until the 20th century, women were generally called by their family name. Nobles received as a pseudo-name the name of the estate in which they lived and this did not change when getting married.

The preservation of his wife's name has been preserved as a tradition among modern Koreans, after women began to give names.

The Koreans began to migrate to the Russian Empire in 1864 long before women were allowed to give names in modern Korean tradition in Korea.

Legislation of the Russian Empire required the mandatory presence of the surname of the name and patronymic name for everyone. Including poor serf wives. When they were married they were given the surname of the husband, a patronymic formed on behalf of the father and given a name from the Sviatcy (List of names of saints of the Orthodox Church).

Generation names
In Korea, it is common for siblings and cousins of the same generation to have one hanja syllable in common among all of their names; this is known as dollimja. Russians have no equivalent practice, although they do have patronyms which the Koryo-saram have for the most part adopted. Therefore, Koryo-saram do not use generation names. They use, depending on religion, either a name from Sviatcy or a name arbitrarily chosen from the hanja character used in Korea to form names.

Language

Due to deportation and the continuing urbanization of the population after 1952, the command of Korean among the Koryo-saram has continued to fall. This contrasts with other more rural minority groups such as the Dungan, who have maintained a higher level of proficiency in their ethnic language. In 1989, the most recent year for which data are available, the number of Russian mother tongue speakers among the Koryo-saram population overtook that of Korean mother tongue speakers.

Relations with Korean expatriates
The 2005 South Korean film Wedding Campaign, directed by Hwang Byung-kook, portrays two aging bachelor farmers from rural villages who hope to find wives. Having no romantic prospects in South Korea, they opt to go through an international mail-order bride agency, which sends them to Uzbekistan and tries to match them with Korean women there.

Religion

See also

Deportation of Koreans in the Soviet Union
Dungan, the Turkic name for Hui Chinese who settled in Central Asia.
List of Koryo-saram
Russians in Korea
Russia-North Korea relations
Russia–South Korea relations
Workers' Party of Korea, whose predecessors were founded by Korean nationalists in exile in the Soviet Union.

Notes

References

Further reading

Census data

Koreans of The South Ussury in 1879

External links
 Association of Scientific and Technological Societies Koreans (ANTOK)
 CIS Koreans Information Web-Site of ARIRANG.RU
 Lib.Ru: the Koreans
 Tashkent Representation of the Institute of Asian Culture and Development (TP IAKR) — an Association of Koreans in Karakalpakstan.
International Center for Korean Studies of Lomonosov Moscow State University
Koryo Saram: the Unreliable People (documentary film)
Koryo Saram Resource of the Central Asian Fulbright Project
 Zheruiyk - Promised land (also known as "Atazhurt") - film about Kazakhstani Koreans

 
Overseas Korean groups
Ethnic groups in Kazakhstan
Ethnic groups in Kyrgyzstan
Ethnic groups in Russia
Ethnic groups in Tajikistan
Ethnic groups in Turkmenistan
Ethnic groups in Ukraine
Ethnic groups in Uzbekistan
Korea–Soviet Union relations